OKK Beograd history and statistics in FIBA Europe and Euroleague Basketball (company) competitions.

European competitions

Record
OKK Beograd has overall, from 1958–59 (first participation) to 1977–78 (last participation): 22 wins against 13 defeats in 35 games for all the European club competitions.

 EuroLeague: 14–7 (21)
 FIBA Saporta Cup
 FIBA Korać Cup: 8–6 (14)

See also
 Yugoslav basketball clubs in European competitions

References

External links
FIBA Europe
EuroLeague
ULEB
EuroCup

Beograd
OKK Beograd